Bjørn Bergh-Pedersen (October 18, 1919 – December 30, 1993) was a Norwegian film producer, actor, and screenplay writer. The film Stevnemøte med glemte år (Rendezvous with Forgotten Years), which he directed and wrote the screenplay for, represented Norway at the 7th Berlin International Film Festival in 1957.

Filmography
1954: Heksenetter, assistant director; film script with Bjarne Andersen and Leif Sinding; actor in the role of Tregenna, a major
1956: Roser til Monica, actor in the role of Bengt Lie, the doctor
1957: Smuglere i smoking, executive producer
1957: Stevnemøte med glemte år, producer and screenwriter
1964: Nydelige nelliker, film script with Knut Bohwim and Knut Andersen based on Egil Lian's novel Drevne karer og ville jenter på strøket

Radio plays
1965: Millionkuppet

Lyrics
Bjørn Bergh-Pedersen wrote the lyrics to Bjørn Vold's song "Roser til Monica" (Roses for Monica). It was recorded by Gunnar Eide with the Billy Hills Orchestra on December 31, 1955. "Roser til Monica" was released on the 78-disc His Master's Voice AL 6008.

References

External links

1919 births
1993 deaths
Norwegian film producers
20th-century Norwegian male writers
20th-century Norwegian male actors